The men's slopestyle competition of the FIS Freestyle World Ski Championships 2013 was held at Myrkdalen-Voss, Norway on March 8 (qualifying) and March 9 (final). 
63 athletes from 23 countries competed.

Qualification

The following are the results of the qualification.

Final
The following are the results of the final.

References

Slopestyle, men's